The Nan Chauncy Award is an Australian children's literature award.  It was initially established as a quinquennial award and is now presented biennially in the Children's Book Council Awards.

The award was established to honour Nan Chauncy, who is recognised as a significant Tasmanian author.

Award category and description

The Nan Chauncy Award is to recognise a person’s outstanding contribution to the field of children’s literature in Australia.

Winners

See also

 List of Australian literary awards

References

External links
 Nan Chauncy Award Guidelines
 CBCA Awards
 Significant Tasmanian Women – Nan Chauncy (1900–1970)

Children's Book Council of Australia
Australian children's literary awards